Diana Wynne Jones (16 August 1934 – 26 March 2011) was a British writer of fantasy novels for children and adults. She wrote a small amount of non-fiction.

Fiction

Books for adults 
 Changeover (1970) - reissued 2004 with a new introduction by Jones, "The Origins of Changeover"
 A Sudden Wild Magic (1992) - British Fantasy Award nominee
 Deep Secret (1997) - part of the Magids Series

Standalone books for children and young adults
 Wilkins' Tooth (1973); (US title: Witch's Business)
 The Ogre Downstairs (1974)
 Dogsbody (1975) – Carnegie Medal commendation
 Eight Days of Luke (1975)
 Power of Three (1976) – Guardian Prize commendation; Zilveren Griffel (Netherlands)
 The Homeward Bounders (1981)
 The Time of the Ghost (1981)
 Archer's Goon (1984) – Boston Globe–Horn Book Award Fiction runner-up; World Fantasy Award for Best Novel nominee
 Fire and Hemlock (1984) Mythopoeic Fantasy Award finalist; 2005 Phoenix Award runner-up
 A Tale of Time City (1987)
 Black Maria (1991); US title: Aunt Maria
 Hexwood (1993)
 The Merlin Conspiracy (2003) - Magids Series
 The Game (2007)
 Enchanted Glass (2010) – Locus Awards, Young Adult 5th place
 Earwig and the Witch (2011) (Illustrated by Paul O. Zelinsky)
 The Islands of Chaldea (2014), an unfinished novel completed by her sister, Ursula Jones

E-book collections
 Diana Wynne Jones’s Fantastical Journeys Collection (2015): contains A Tale of Time City, The Homeward Bounders, and The Islands of Chaldea
 Diana Wynne Jones’s Magic and Myths Collection (2015): contains The Game, Power of Three, Eight Days of Luke, and Dogsbody

Series for children and young adults

Chrestomanci series

The Chrestomanci fantasy series is made up of six novels and four short stories.

Publication order
 Charmed Life (1977) – Guardian Children's Fiction Prize; Carnegie Medal commendation; Preis der Leseratten (ZDF Schülerexpress, Germany)
 The Magicians of Caprona (1980)
 Witch Week (1982)
 The Lives of Christopher Chant (1988) – Carnegie Medal commendation
 Mixed Magics (2000), short stories published 1982 to 2000
 Conrad's Fate (2005)
 The Pinhoe Egg (2006) – Mythopoeic Fantasy Award Children's finalist; Locus Award Young Adult Book, 6th place

If the short stories in Mixed Magics are counted separately, the order of release is:

 Charmed Life (1977)
 The Magicians of Caprona (1980)
 Witch Week (1982)
 "The Sage of Theare", in Hecate's Cauldron (1982) ed. Susan M. Schwartz
 "Warlock at the Wheel", in Warlock at the Wheel (1984) by Jones
 "Carol Oneir's Hundredth Dream", in Dragons and Dreams (1986) ed. Jane Yolen et al.
 The Lives of Christopher Chant (1988)
 "Stealer of Souls", in Mixed Magics (2000) by Jones
 Conrad's Fate (2005)
 The Pinhoe Egg (2006)

Reading order as suggested by Jones
Diana Wynne Jones recommended reading the books in this order:
 Charmed Life (1977)
 The Lives of Christopher Chant (1988)
 Conrad's Fate (2005)
 Witch Week (1982)
 The Magicians of Caprona (1980)

Chronicles of Chrestomanci
The novels were also published as a three-volume series called Chronicles of Chrestomanci:
 Volume 1 (2001) contains Charmed Life and The Lives of Christopher Chant
 Volume 2 (2001) contains Witch Week and The Magicians of Caprona
 Volume 3 (2008) contains Conrad's Fate and The Pinhoe Egg

Dalemark Quartet
 Cart and Cwidder (1975)
 Drowned Ammet (1977)
 The Spellcoats (1979)
 Crown of Dalemark (1993) – Mythopoeic Award, Children's Fantasy
"The True State of Affairs" is set in Dalemark, but doesn't share any characters with the novels.

Compilations
 The Dalemark Quartet, Vol. 1: Cart and Cwidder & Drowned Ammet (1977)
 The Dalemark Quartet, Vol. 2: The Spellcoats & The Crown of Dalemark (1993)
 The Dalemark Quartet (2003) (Illustrated by Anne Yvonne Gilbert)

Derkholm series
 Dark Lord of Derkholm (1998) – Mythopoeic Award, Children's Fantasy
 Year of the Griffin (2000)

The Moving Castle series
 Howl's Moving Castle (1986) – Boston Globe–Horn Book Award Fiction runner-up; 2006 Phoenix Award
 Castle in the Air (1990) – Mythopoeic Fantasy Award Children's finalist
 House of Many Ways (2008) – Mythopoeic Fantasy Award Children's finalist

Compilations
 Wizard's Castle (Howl's Moving Castle, and Castle in the Air) (2002) (Illustrated by Anne Yvonne Gilbert)
 World of Howl Collection (Howl's Moving Castle, Castle in the Air, and House of Many Ways) (2014)

Magids series
 Deep Secret (1997), a novel marketed for adults, listed above
 The Merlin Conspiracy (2003) – Locus Awards, Young Adult 3rd place, a novel marketed for young adults

Picture books and books for younger readers
 Who Got Rid of Angus Flint? (1978), illustrated by John Sewell; text originally published in Young Winter's Tales 6 (1975)
 The Four Grannies (1980)
 Chair Person (1989)
 Wild Robert (1989)
 Yes, Dear (1992), large-format picture book illus. Graham Philpott
 Puss in Boots (1999)
 Enna Hittims (2006), Illustrated by Peter Utton

Compilations 
 Stopping for a Spell (1993), Illustrated by Chris Mould. Contains "Who Got Rid of Angus Flint?", "The Four Grannies", and "Chair Person"
 Vile Visitors (2012). Contains "Who Got Rid of Angus Flint", and "Chair Person"
 Freaky Families (2013). Contains "The Four Grannies", and "Auntie Bea's Day Out"

Anthologies edited by Jones
 Hidden Turnings: A Collection of Stories Through Time and Space (Editor, 1989)
 Introduction
 "True Believer" by Douglas Hill
 "Ceres Passing" by Tanith Lee
 "Fifty-Fafty" by Robert Westall
 "Dogfaerie" by Garry Kilworth
 "The Walled Garden" by Lisa Tuttle
 "The Master" by Diana Wynne Jones
 "The Vision" by Mary Rayner
 "Urgeya’s Choice" by Geraldine Harris
 "The Sky Sea" by Helen Cresswell
 "A Bird That Whistles" by Emma Bull
 "Kalifriki of the Thread" by Roger Zelazny
 "Turntables of the Night" by Terry Pratchett
 "The Authors (Hidden Turnings)"
 Spellbound: Fantasy Stories (Editor, 1995) Alternate Titles: Fantasy Stories (1994, UK), Spellbound (1994/1995, Illustrated by Robin Lawrie, republished 2007, US), Fantasy Stories: Red Hot Reads (2003/2004)
 "The Peasant and The Devil" by The Brothers Grimm
 "Boris Chernevsky’s Hands" by Jane Yolen
 "The Hobgoblin’s Hat" by Tove Jansson
 "Ully the Piper" by Andre Norton
 "Milo Conducts the Dawn" by Norton Juster
 "Who Goes Down this Dark Road?" by Joan Aiken
 "The House of Harfang" by C. S. Lewis (from The Silver Chair)
 "Martha in The Witch’s Power" by Katharine Mary Briggs (from Hobberdy Dick)
 "Abu Ali Meets a Dragon" by Noel Langley from The Land of Green Ginger)
 "The Box of Delights" by John Masefield (an extract)
 "The Amazing Flight of the Gump" by L. Frank Baum (from The Land of Oz)
 "On the Great Wall" by Rudyard Kipling (from Puck of Pook’s Hill)
 "The Waking of the Kraken" by Eva Ibbotson (from Which Witch?)
 "The Caves in the Hills" by Elizabeth Goudge (from Henrietta’s House)
 "Bigger than the Baker’s Boy" by E. Nesbit (from Five Children and It)
 "Jermain and the Sorceress" by Patricia C. Wrede (from The Seven Towers)
 "Una and the Red Cross Knight" by Andrew Lang (from The Red Book of Romance)
 "What the Cat Told Me" by Diana Wynne Jones
 Acknowledgements

Short stories

Contributed short stories
These short stories were not published as separate volumes, and not included in any collections entirely written by Jones (the next section).
 "Mela Worms", in Arrows of Eros (NEL, 1989, editor Alex Stewart)
 "I'll Give You My Word", in Firebirds Rising: An Anthology of Original Science Fiction and Fantasy (Penguin, 2005, and 2006, editor Sharyn November), and Year’s Best Fantasy 7 (2007, editors David G. Hartnell & Kathryn Cramer)
 "JoBoy", in The Dragon Book: Magical Tales from the Masters of Modern Fantasy (Ace, 2009, editors Jack Dann and Gardner Dozois), and The Best Science Fiction and Fantasy of the Year, Volume 4 (2010, editor Jonathan Strahan)
 "Samantha's Diary", in Stories: All-New Tales (HarperCollins, 2010, editors Neil Gaiman and Al Sarrantonio)

Short story collections
 Warlock at the Wheel and Other Stories (1984), 8 stories publ. 1978 to 1984
 "Warlock at the Wheel"
 "The Plague of Peacocks"
 "The Fluffy Pink Toadstool"
 "Aunt Bea’s Day Out"
 "Carruthers"
 "No One"
 "Dragon Reserve, Home Eight"
 "The Sage of Theare"
 Everard’s Ride (1994/1995, republished 1997): a 1983 essay and 7 stories publ. 1984 to 1995
 Introduction by Patricia C. Wrede
 "Everard’s Ride"
 "Nad and Dan Adn Quaffy"
 "The Shape of the Narrative in 'The Lord of the Rings'" (essay)
 "No One"
 "Dragon Reserve, Home Eight"
 "The Master"
 "The Plague of Peacocks"
 "The True State of Affairs"
 Stopping for a Spell: Three Fantasies (1993), publ. 1975 to 1989, Illustrated by Chris Mould
 "Who Got Rid of Angus Flint?"
 "The Four Grannies"
 "Chair Person"
 Minor Arcana (1996), UK Release, 7 stories publ. 1982 to 1995 – British Fantasy Award nominee
 "The Sage of Theare"
 "The Master"
 "The Girl Who Loved the Sun"
 "Dragon Reserve, Home Eight"
 "What the Cat Told Me"
 "Nad and Dan Adn Quaffy"
 "The True State of Affairs"
 Believing is Seeing: Seven Stories (1999), US Release, 7 stories publ. 1982 to 1999, Illustrated by Nenad Jakesevik
 "The Sage of Theare"
 "The Master"
 "Enna Hittims"
 "The Girl Who Loved the Sun"
 "Dragon Reserve, Home Eight"
 "What the Cat Told Me"
 "Nad and Dan Adn Quaffy"
 "Excerpt from Howl’s Moving Castle"
 "Excerpt from The Merlin Conspiracy"
 "Excerpt from Dark Lord of Derkholm"
 "Excerpt from Archer’s Goon"
 Mixed Magics: Four Tales of Chrestomanci (2000)
 "Warlock at the Wheel"
 "Stealer of Souls"
 "Carol Oneir’s Hundredth Dream"
 "The Sage of Theare"
 Unexpected Magic: Collected Stories (2002), 16 stories published 1978 to 2003
 "The Girl Jones"
 "Nad and Dan Adn Quaffy"
 "The Plague of Peacocks"
 "The Master"
 "Enna Hittims"
 "The Girl who Loved the Sun"
 "The Fluffy Pink Toadstool"
 "Auntie Bea’s Day Out"
 "Carruthers"
 "What the Cat Told Me"
 "The Green Stone"
 "The Fat Wizard"
 "No One"
 "Dragon Reserve, Home Eight"
 "Little Dot"
 "Everard’s Ride"

Standalone short stories
Published also in other collections
 "Who Got Rid of Angus Flint?" (1978)
 "The Four Grannies" (1980 and 1981)
 "Chair Person" (1989)
 "Stealer of Souls" (2000)
 "Enna Hittims" (2006)

Anthologies her works were included in
 Young Winter's Tales 3 (1972, edited by M. R. Hodgkin), with "Carruthers"
 Young Winter's Tales 6 (1975, edited by M. R. Hodgkin), with "Who Got Rid of Angus Flint?"
 Young Winter's Tales 8 (1978, edited by D. J. Denney), with "Auntie Bea's Day Out"
 Puffin Post v13 #4 (1979, magazine), with "The Fluffy Pink Toadstool"
 The Cat Flap and the Apple Pie and Other Funny Stories (1979, edited by Lance Salway) with "Auntie Bea's Day Out"
 Hecate’s Cauldron (1982, editor Susan Schwartz), with "The Sage of Theare"
 Dragons & Dreams: A Collection of New Fantasy and Science Fiction Stories (1986, editor Jane Yolen), with "Carol Oneir’s Hundredth Dream"
 Guardian Angels (1987, editor Stephanie Nuttell, Viking Kestrel) with "The Fat Wizard"
 The Methuen Book of Humorous Stories (1987, editor Jennifer Kavanagh, illustrator Scowler Anderson), with "Enna Hittims"
 Gaslight and Ghosts (1988, editors Stephen Jones and Jo Fletcher) with "The Green Stone"
 Arrows of Eros (1989, editor Alex Stewart), with "Mela Worms"
 Dragons and Warrior Daughters: Fantasy Stories by Women Writers (1989, editor Jessica Yates), with "Dragon Reserve, Home Eight"
 Hidden Turnings (1989), with "The Master"
 Things That Go Bump in the Night (1989, editors Jane Yolen and Martin Harry Greenberg) with "Chair Person"
 Digital Dreams (1990, editor David V. Barrett), with "Nad and Dan Adn Quaffy"
 Heartache (1990, edited by Miraim Hodgson, Methuen), with "The Girl Who Loved the Sun"
 Fenix, V3, #1, 1992 (1992, editor Rafal A. Ziemkiewicz), with "Mela Worms" (translation)
 Bruce Coville's UFOs (1994, 2000, edited by Bruce Coville), with "Dragon Reserve, Home Eight"
 A Treasury of Witches and Wizards (1996, editor David Bennett), republished The Kingfisher Treasury of Witch and Wizard Stories (2004, editor David Bennett), with "The Fat Wizard"
 The Random House Book of Fantasy Stories (1997, editor Mike Ashley), alternate title Fantasy Stories, with "The Green Stone"
 Mystery Stories (1998, editor Helen Cresswell), with "The Master"
 The Wizards’ Den: Spellbinding Stories of Magic & Magicians (2001 and 2003, editor Peter Haining), with "Carol Oneir’s Hundredth Dream"
 Firebirds: An Anthology of Original Fantasy and Science Fiction (2003, editor Sharyn November), with "Little Dot"
 The Mammoth Book of Sorcerer’s Tales: The Ultimate Collection of Magical Fantasy (2004, editor Mike Ashley), with "The Sage of Theare"
 Now We Are Sick: An Anthology of Nasty Verse (2005, Editors Neil Gaiman and Stephen Jones), with "A Slice of Life" (Poetry for adults)
 Firebirds Rising: An Anthology of Original Science Fiction and Fantasy (2005 and 2006, editor Sharyn November), with "I’ll Give you My Word"
 Year’s Best Fantasy 7 (2007, editors David G. Hartnell & Kathryn Cramer), with "I’ll Give You My Word"
 Plokta, May 2009 (2009, editors Steve Davies, Alison Scott, and Mike Scott), with "Samantha's Diary"
 The Dragon Book: Magical Tales from the Masters of Modern Fantasy (2009, editors Jack Dann and Gardner Dozois), with "JoBoy"
 The Best Science Fiction and Fantasy of the Year, Volume 4 (2010, editor Jonathan Strahan), with "JoBoy"
 Stories: All-New Tales (2010, editors Neil Gaiman and Al Sarrantonio), with "Samantha’s Diary"
 Unnatural Creatures (2013, editor Neil Gaiman), with "The Sage of Theare"
 The Mammoth Book of Dark Magic (2013, editor Mike Ashley, alternate title The Mammoth Book of Black Magic, with "The Sage of Theare"
 Escape Pod, EP427 (2013, editor Norm Sherman), with "Samantha's Diary"

Complete list of short stories in alphabetical order
 "Auntie Bea’s Day Out", found in Auntie Bea's Day Out (standalone, 1978), and The Cat Flap and the Apple Pie and Other Funny Stories (1979), and Warlock at the Wheel and Other Stories (1984), and Unexpected Magic: Collected Stories (2002), and Freaky Families (2013)
 "Carol Oneir’s Hundredth Dream", found in Dragons & Dreams: A Collection of New Fantasy and Science Fiction Stories (1986), and Mixed Magics: Four Tales of Chrestomanci (2000), and The Wizards’ Den: Spellbinding Stories of Magic & Magicians (2001 and 2003)
 "Carruthers", found in Young Winter's Tales 3 (1972), and Warlock at the Wheel and Other Stories (1984), and Unexpected Magic: Collected Stories (2002)
 "Chair Person", found in Things that Go Bump in the Night (1989), and Chair Person (stand alone 1989), and Stopping for a Spell (2002), and Vile Visitors (2012)
 "Dragon Reserve, Home Eight", found in Warlock at the Wheel and Other Stories (1984), and Dragons and Warrior Daughters: Fantasy Stories by Women Writers (1989), and Bruce Coville's UFOs (1994, 2000), and Everard’s Ride (1995, republished 1997), and Minor Arcana (1996), and Believing is Seeing: Seven Stories (1999), and Unexpected Magic: Collected Stories (2002)
 "Enna Hittims", found in The Methuen Book of Humorous Stories (1987), and Believing is Seeing: Seven Stories (1999), and Unexpected Magic: Collected Stories (2002), and Enna Hittims (stand alone, 2006)
 "Everard’s Ride", found in Everard’s Ride (1995, republished 1997), and Unexpected Magic: Collected Stories (2002)
 "I’ll Give You My Word", found in Firebirds Rising: An Anthology of Original Science Fiction and Fantasy (2005 and 2006, editor Sharyn November), and Year’s Best Fantasy 7 (2007, editors David G. Hartnell & Kathryn Cramer)
 "JoBoy", found in The Dragon Book: Magical Tales from the Masters of Modern Fantasy (2009, editors Jack Dann and Gardner Dozois), and The Best Science Fiction and Fantasy of the Year, Volume 4 (2010, editor Jonathan Strahan)
 "Little Dot", found in Firebirds: An Anthology of Original Fantasy and Science Fiction (2003), and Unexpected Magic: Collected Stories (2002)
 "Mela Worms", in Arrows of Eros (1989), and Fenix, V3, #1, 1992 (1992, translation)
 "Nad and Dan Adn Quaffy", found in Digital Dreams (1990), and Everard’s Ride (1995, republished 1997), and Minor Arcana (1996), and Believing is Seeing: Seven Stories (1999), and Unexpected Magic: Collected Stories (2002)
 "No One", found in Warlock at the Wheel and Other Stories (1984), and Everard’s Ride (1995, republished 1997), and Unexpected Magic: Collected Stories (2002)
 "Samantha’s Diary", found in Plokta, May 2009 (2009), and Stories: All-New Tales (2010, editor Neil Gaiman), and Escape Pod, EP427 (2013)
 "Stealer of Souls", found in Mixed Magics: Four Tales of Chrestomanci (2000), Stealer of Souls stand alone (2000)
 "The Fat Wizard", found in Guardian Angels (1987), and A Treasury of Witches and Wizards, (1996, republished as The Kingfisher Treasury of Witch and Wizard Stories, 2004), and Unexpected Magic: Collected Stories (2002)
 "The Fluffy Pink Toadstool", found in Puffin Post v13 #4 (1979), and Warlock at the Wheel and Other Stories (1984), and Unexpected Magic: Collected Stories (2002)
 "The Four Grannies", found in The Four Grannies (standalone, 1980 and 1981), and in Stopping for a Spell (2002), and Freaky Families (2013)
 "The Green Stone", found in Gaslight and Ghosts (1988), and The Random House Book of Fantasy Stories (1997), and Unexpected Magic: Collected Stories (2002)
 "The Girl Jones", found in Unexpected Magic: Collected Stories (2002), and Reflections: On the Magic of Writing (2012)
 "The Girl Who Loved the Sun", found in Heartache (1990), and Minor Arcana (1996), and Believing is Seeing: Seven Stories (1999), and Unexpected Magic: Collected Stories (2002)
 "The Master", found in Hidden Turnings: A Collection of Stories Through Time and Space (1989), and Everard's Ride (1995, republished 1997), and Minor Arcana (1996), and Mystery Stories (1998), and Believing is Seeing: Seven Stories (1999), and Unexpected Magic: Collected Stories (2002)
 "The Plague of Peacocks", found in Warlock at the Wheel and Other Stories (1984), and Everard’s Ride (1995, republished 1997), and Unexpected Magic: Collected Stories (2002)
 "The Sage of Theare", found in Hecate’s Cauldron (1982), and Warlock at the Wheel and Other Stories (1984), and Minor Arcana (1996), and Believing is Seeing: Seven Stories (1999), and Mixed Magics: Four Tales of Chrestomanci (2000), and The Mammoth Book of Sorcerer’s Tales: The Ultimate Collection of Magical Fantasy (2004), and Unnatural Creatures (2013), and The Mammoth Book of Dark Magic (2013, alternate title The Mammoth Book of Black Magic)
 "The True State of Affairs", found in Everard’s Ride (1995, republished 1997), and Minor Arcana (1996)
 "Warlock at the Wheel", found in Warlock at the Wheel and Other Stories (1984), and Mixed Magics: Four Tales of Chrestomanci (2000)
 "What the Cat Told Me", found in Spellbound: Fantasy Stories (1995), and Minor Arcana (1996), and Believing is Seeing: Seven Stories (1999), and Unexpected Magic: Collected Stories (2002)
 "Who Got Rid of Angus Flint?", found in Young Winter's Tales 6 (1975), and Who Got Rid of Angus Flint? (stand alone, 1978), and Stopping for a Spell (2002), and Vile Visitors (2012)

Plays
 The Batterpool Business (1968)
 The King’s Things (1970)
 The Terrible Fisk Machine (1972)

Poetry
Diana Wynne Jones also wrote several short stories and poems that have been published in anthologies.
 "A Slice of Life" found in Now We Are Sick: An Anthology of Nasty Verse (2005, Editors Neil Gaiman and Stephen Jones), a poetry anthology for adults

Nonfiction and humor
 The Skiver's Guide (1984)
 The Tough Guide to Fantasyland (1996) is presented as a travel guidebook for fictional worlds (a play on Rough Guides). Although boderline, ISFDB catalogues it as nonfiction. The US Library of Congress catalogues it as a dictionary. Hugo Award Nonfiction nominee; Locus Award, Nonfiction 3rd place; World Fantasy Award finalist. A revised edition was published in 2006.

Nonfiction and essays

Interviews
 "Diana Wynne Jones: Writing for Children" (1989), in Locus #339 April 1989 (1989)
 "A Sudden Wild Mage: A Rough Guide to Diana Wynne Jones" (1997) by David V. Barrett, in Interzone, #117 March 1997 (1997)
 "Diana Wynne Jones" (2006) by Leonard S. Marcus, in The Wand in the Word: Conversations with Writers of Fantasy (2006)
 "An Excerpt from a Conversation with Diana Wynne Jones" by Charlie Butler, in Vector  268 (2011)

Book Introductions
Diana Wynne Jones wrote introductions to the following books:
 The Phantom Tollbooth by Norton Juster (originally published 1961)
 Journey to the Centre of the Earth by Jules Verne, translated by Robert Baldick (originally published 1961)
 The Spiral Garden by Louise Cooper (2000)

Reviews
 "The White Devil" (1988) by John Webster

Essays
 The Medusa article in which Jones discusses her opinions of adult literature as opposed to children's literature.
 "The Shape of the Narrative in 'The Lord of the Rings'", found in Everard’s Ride (1995 and 1997), and Reflections: On the Magic of Writing (2012)
 "Why Don't You Write Real Books?" (1987), in Vector 140 (1987) and Reflections on the Magic of Writing (2012)
 "Introduction (Hidden Turnings)" (1989)
 letter in Vector #159 (1991)
 "Two Kinds of Writing" (1991), in Nexus #1, April 1991 (1991), and Reflections on the Magic of Writing (2012)
 "Aiming for the Moon" (1993), in Focus, December/January 1994 (1994)
 "Introduction (Believing is Seeing: Seven Stories)" (1996)
 "Introduction (Minor Arcana (Diana Wynne Jones anthology)|Minor Arcana)" (1996)
 "Joan Aiken: Influences" (1997), in Secret City: Strange Tales of London (1997)
 letter in Ansible #134 (1998)
 letter in Ansible #155 (2000)
 letter in Ansible #182 (2002)
 letter in Ansible #183 (2002)
 "How I Came to Write this Guidebook (The Tough Guide to Fantasyland)" (2006)
 letter in Ansible #246 (2008)
 "Howl's Moving Castle: Book to Film (Nebula Awards Showcase 2008)" (2008), in Nebula Awards Showcase 2008 (2008)
 letter in Ansible #276 (2010)

Essay Collections
 "Reflections On the Magic of Writing" (2012) - A collection of more than 25 papers including autobiographical tales, literary criticism, though about life and writing, and information about the origins of her books. Includes a foreword by Neil Gaiman, and an introduction and interview by Charlie Butler.
 "Foreword" by Neil Gaiman
 "Reflecting on Reflections" by Charlie Butler
 "The Children in the Wood"
 "The Shape of the Narrative in 'The Lord of the Rings'"
 "Two Kinds of Writing?"
 "When I Won the Guardian Award"
 "Reading C. S. Lewis’s Narnia"
 "Creating the Experience"
 "Fantasy Books for Children"
 "The Value of Learning Anglo-Saxon"
 "The Halloween Worms"
 "A Day Visiting Schools"
 "Writing for Children: A Matter of Responsibility"
 "The Heroic Ideal: A Personal Odyssey"
 "A Talk About Rules"
 "Answers to Some Questions"
 "Some Hints on Writing"
 "A Whirlwind Tour of Australia"
 "- Lecture One: Heroes"
 "- Lecture Two: Negatives and Positives in Children’s Literature"
(* "- Lecture Three: Why Don’t You Write Real Books?"
 "Inventing the Middle Ages"
 "Some Truths About Writing"
 "The Origins of 'The Merlin Conspiracy'"
 "Review of "Boy in Darkness" by Melvyn Peake"
 "- Freedom to Write"
 "- Our Hidden Gifts"
 "Characterization: Advice for Young Writers"
 "Something About the Author"
 "The Girl Jones"
 "The Origins of 'Changeover'"
 "A Conversation with Diana Wynne Jones"
 "Two Family Views of Diana and Her Work"
 "- Fantasies for Children"
 "- Address at Diana’s Funeral"
 "Diana Wynne Jones Bibliography"

List of anthologies containing her essays and interviews
 Secret City: Strange Tales of London (1997, editors Stephen Jones and Jo Fletcher), with "Joan Aiken: Influences"
 The Wand in the Word: Conversations with Writers of Fantasy (2006, editor Leonard S. Marcus), with "Diana Wynne Jones" (2006) by Leonard S. Marcus - Interview
 Nebula Awards Showcase 2008 (2008, editor Ben Bova), with "Howl's Moving Castle: Book to Film (Nebula Awards Showcase 2008)"

Entire bibliography in order of publication

1960s
 Introduction to The Phantom Tollbooth by Norton Juster (originally published 1961)
 Introduction to Journey to the Centre of the Earth by Jules Verne, translated by Robert Baldick (originally published 1961)
 The Batterpool Business (1968) - Play

1970s
 Changeover (1970) - Adults
 The King’s Things (1970) - Play
 The Terrible Fisk Machine (1972) - Play
 Young Winter's Tales 3 (1972, edited by M. R. Hodgkin), with "Carruthers" - Contributor
 Wilkins' Tooth (1973), US title: Witch's Business
 The Ogre Downstairs (1974)
 Young Winter's Tales 6 (1975, edited by M. R. Hodgkin), with "Who Got Rid of Angus Flint?" - Contributor
 Eight Days of Luke (1975)
 Dogsbody (1975)
 Cart and Cwidder (1975) – Dalemark
 Power of Three (1976)
 Charmed Life (1977) – Chrestomanci
 Drowned Ammet (1977) – Dalemark
 The Dalemark Quartet, Vol. 1: Cart and Cwidder & Drowned Ammet (1977) - Dalemark Compilation
 Young Winter's Tales 8 (1978, edited by D. J. Denney), with "Auntie Bea's Day Out" - Contributor
 Who Got Rid of Angus Flint? (1978)
 Puffin Post v13 #4 (1979, magazine) with "The Fluffy Pink Toadstool" - Contributor
 The Cat Flap and the Apple Pie and Other Funny Stories (1979, edited by Lance Salway), with "Auntie Bea's Day Out" - Contributor
 The Spellcoats (1979) – Dalemark

1980s
 The Four Grannies (1980)
 The Magicians of Caprona (1980) – Chrestomanci
 The Time of the Ghost (1981)
 The Homeward Bounders (1981)
 Hecate’s Cauldron (1982, editor Susan Schwartz), with "The Sage of Theare" - Contributor
 Witch Week (1982) – Chrestomanci
 Warlock at the Wheel and Other Stories (1984), collection
 Archer's Goon (1984)
 The Skiver's Guide (1984), nonfiction/humor
 Fire and Hemlock (1985)
 Dragons & Dreams: A Collection of New Fantasy and Science Fiction Stories (1986, editor Jane Yolen), with "Carol Oneir’s Hundredth Dream" - Contributor
 Howl's Moving Castle (1986) – Howl's Castle
 "Why Don't You Write Real Books?" (1987) in Vector 140
 The Methuen Book of Humorous Stories (1987, editor Jennifer Kavanagh, illustrator Scowler Anderson), with "Enna Hittims" - Contributor
 Guardian Angels (1987, editor Stephanie Nuttell, Viking Kestrel), with "The Fat Wizard" - Contributor
 A Tale of Time City (1987)
 Gaslight and Ghosts (1988, editors Stephen Jones and Jo Fletcher) with "The Green Stone"
 The Lives of Christopher Chant (1988) – Chrestomanci
 Review: The White Devil (1988) by John Webster
 Things that Go Bump in the Night (1989, editors Jane Yolen and Martin Harry Greenberg), with "Chair Person" - Contributor
 Chair Person (1989)
 Wild Robert (1989)
 Hidden Turnings, edited (1989), with "The Master" - Anthology, Contributor
 Arrows of Eros (1989, editor Alex Stewart), with "Mela Worms" - Contributor
 Dragons and Warrior Daughters: Fantasy Stories by Women Writers (1989, editor Jessica Yates), with "Dragon Reserve, Home Eight" - Contributor
 Locus #339 April 1989 (1989, editor Charles N. Brown), with "Diana Wynne Jones: Writing for Children" (1989) - Interview

1990s
 Digital Dreams (1990, editor David V. Barrett), with "Nad and Dan Adn Quaffy" - Contributor
 Heartache (1990, editor Miriam Hodgson, Methuen), with "The Girl Who Loved the Sun" - Contributor
 Castle in the Air (1990) – Howl's Castle
 Wizard's Castle (1990) - Howl's Castle Compilation
 Black Maria (1991)
 letter in Vector #159 (1991)
 Nexus #1, April 1991 (1991, editor Paul Brazier), with "Two Kinds of Writing" (1991) - Essay Contributor
 Now We Are Sick: An Anthology of Nasty Verse (1991, 1994, 2005, Editors Neil Gaiman and Stephen Jones), with "A Slice of Life" - Poetry for Adults, Contributor
 Yes, Dear (1992)
 A Sudden Wild Magic (1992), Adults
 Fenix, V3, #1, 1992 (1992, editor Rafal A. Ziemkiewicz) with "Mela Worms" (translation) - Contributor
 Hexwood (1993)
 Crown of Dalemark (1993) – Dalemark
 Focus, December/January 1993 (1993, editors Julie Venner and Carol Ann Green), with "Aiming for the Moon" - Essay Contributor
 The Dalemark Quartet, Vol. 2: The Spellcoats & The Crown of Dalemark (1993) - Dalemark compilation
 The Dalemark Quartet (1993) - Dalemark compilation
 Stopping for a Spell (1993), collection
 Bruce Coville's UFOs (1994, 2000, edited by Bruce Coville), with "Dragon Reserve, Home Eight" - Contributor
 Everard's Ride (1995) - Collection
 Spellbound: Fantasy Stories, edited (1995), with "What the Cat Told Me" - Anthology, Contributor
 Minor Arcana (1996) - Collection
 A Treasury of Witches and Wizards (1996, editor David Bennett), republished The Kingfisher Treasury of Witch and Wizard Stories (2004, editor David Bennett), with "The Fat Wizard" - Contributor
 The Tough Guide to Fantasyland (1996) - Nonfiction/humor
 Secret City: Strange Tales of London (1997, editors Stephen Jones and Jo Fletcher), with "Joan Aiken: Influences" - Essay Contributor
 Interzone, #117 March 1997 (1997, editor David Pringle) "A Sudden Wild Mage: A Rough Guide to Diana Wynne Jones" (1997) by David V. Barrett - Interview
 The Random House Book of Fantasy Stories (1997, editor Mike Ashley), alternate title Fantasy Stories with "The Green Stone" - Contributor
 Deep Secret (1997) – Magids, Adults
 letter in Ansible #134 (1998)
 Mystery Stories (1998, editor Helen Cresswell), with "The Master" - Contributor
 Dark Lord of Derkholm (1998) – Derkholm
 The Worlds of Chrestomanci (Chrestomanci # 1-4) (1998) - Chrestomanci Compilation
 Puss in Boots (1999)
 Believing is Seeing (1999), collection

2000s
 The Spiral Garden by Louise Cooper (2000) - book introduction
 Year of the Griffin (2000) – Derkholm
 Mixed Magics: Four Tales of Chrestomanci (2000), collection – Chrestomanci
 Stealer of Souls (2000) – Chrestomanci
 letter in Ansible #155 (2000)
 The Chronicles of Chrestomanci Volume 1 (2001) - Chrestomanci compilation
 The Chronicles of Chrestomanci Volume 2 (2001) - Chrestomanci compilation
 The Wizards’ Den: Spellbinding Stories of Magic & Magicians (2001 and 2003, editor Peter Haining), with "Carol Oneir’s Hundredth Dream" - Contributor
 Unexpected Magic (2002), collection
 letter in Ansible #182 (2002)
 letter in Ansible #183 (2002)
 Wizard's Castle (2002) - Howl's Castle compilation (Illustrated by Anne Yvonne Gilbert)
 Firebirds: An Anthology of Original Fantasy and Science Fiction (2003, editor Sharyn November) with "Little Dot" - Contributor
 The Merlin Conspiracy (2003) – Magids
 The Dalemark Quartet (2003) - Dalemark compilation (Illustrated by Anne Yvonne Gilbert)
 The Mammoth Book of Sorcerer’s Tales: The Ultimate Collection of Magical Fantasy (2004, editor Mike Ashley), with "The Sage of Theare" - Contributor
 Firebirds Rising: An Anthology of Original Science Fiction and Fantasy (2005 and 2006, editor Sharyn November), with "I’ll Give you My Word" - Contributor
 Conrad's Fate (2005) – Chrestomanci
 The Tough Guide to Fantasyland: Revised and Updated Edition (2006)
 The Wand in the Word: Conversations with Writers of Fantasy (2006, editor Leonard S. Marcus), with "Diana Wynne Jones" (2006) by Leonard S. Marcus - Interview
 The Pinhoe Egg (2006) – Chrestomanci
 Enna Hittims (2006), Illustrated by Peter Utton
 Year’s Best Fantasy 7 (2007, editors David G. Hartnell & Kathryn Cramer), with "I’ll Give You My Word" - Contributor
 The Game (2007)
 The Chronicles of Chrestomanci Volume 3 (2008) - Chrestomanci compilation
 House of Many Ways (2008) – Howl's Castle
 letter in Ansible #246 (2008)
 Nebula Awards Showcase 2008 (2008, editor Ben Bova), with "Howl's Moving Castle: Book to Film (Nebula Awards Showcase 2008)" - Essay Contributor
 The Dragon Book: Magical Tales from the Masters of Modern Fantasy (2009, editors Jack Dann and Gardner Dozois), with "JoBoy" - Contributor
 Plokta, May 2009 (2009, editors Steve Davies, Alison Scott, and Mike Scott), with Samantha's Diary - Contributor

2010s
 Enchanted Glass (2010)
 The Best Science Fiction and Fantasy of the Year, Volume 4 (2010, editor Jonathan Strahan) with "JoBoy" - Contributor
 Stories: All-New Tales (2010, editors Neil Gaiman and Al Sarrantonio), with "Samantha’s Diary" - Contributor
 letter in Ansible #276 (2010)

Published posthumously:
 Earwig and the Witch (2011) (Illustrated by Paul O. Zelinsky)
 "An Excerpt from a Conversation with Diana Wynne Jones" by Charlie Butler, in Vector  268 (2011)
 Reflections On the Magic of Writing (2012), nonfiction
 Unnatural Creatures (2013, editor Neil Gaiman), with "The Sage of Theare" - Contributor
 The Mammoth Book of Dark Magic (2013, editor Mike Ashley, alternate title The Mammoth Book of Black Magic), with "The Sage of Theare" - Contributor
 Escape Pod, EP427 (2013, editor Norm Sherman), with "Samantha's Diary" - Contributor
 The Islands of Chaldea (2014), by Jones and her sister Ursula Jones

New Collections:
 Diana Wynne Jones Chrestomanci 6 Books Collection (2012) - Chrestomanci compilation
 Vile Visitors (2012) - young readers compilation
 The Chrestomanci Series: Entire Collection Books 1-7 (2013) - Chrestomanci compilation
 Freaky Families (2013) - young readers compilation
 The Chrestomanci Series: Books 1-3 (2014) - Chrestomanci compilation
 World of Howl Collection (2014) - Howl's Compilation
 Diana Wynne Jones’s Fantastical Journeys Collection (2015) - Compilation
 Diana Wynne Jones’s Magic and Myths Collection (2015) - Compilation

References

External links
 
 
  

Bibliographies by writer
Bibliographies of British writers
Children's literature bibliographies